Autec Heliport  is a public use heliport located 1 nm east-northeast of Andros Town, the Bahamas.

See also
List of airports in the Bahamas

References

External links 
 Airport record for Autec Heliport at Landings.com

Airports in the Bahamas